Adder's tongue is a common name for several plants and may refer to:

Ophioglossum, a genus of ferns in the family Ophioglossaceae
Erythronium (also known as fawn lily, trout lily, or dog's-tooth violet), a genus of lilies